The Luiseño language is a Uto-Aztecan language of California spoken by the Luiseño, a Native American people who at the time of first contact with the Spanish in the 16th century inhabited the coastal area of southern California, ranging  from the southern part of Los Angeles County, California, to the northern part of San Diego County, California, and inland . The people are called "Luiseño", owing to their proximity to the Mission San Luis Rey de Francia.

The language is highly endangered, but an active language revitalization project is underway, assisted by linguists from the University of California, Riverside. The Pechanga Band of Luiseño Indians offers classes for children, and in 2013, "the tribe ... began funding a graduate-level Cal State San Bernardino Luiseño class, one of the few for-credit university indigenous-language courses in the country." In 2012, a Luiseño video game for the Nintendo DS was being used to teach the language to young people.

Juaneño, the Luiseño dialect spoken by the Acjachemen, is extinct.

Morphology
Luiseño is an agglutinative language, where words use suffix complexes for a variety of purposes with several morphemes strung together.

Phonology

Vowels 
Luiseño has ten vowel phonemes, five long and five short. 

Diphthongs include ey , ow  and oow .

Luiseño vowels have three lengths.

 Short: The basic vowel length. In writing, this is the standard value of a given vowel, e.g. .
 Long: The vowel is held twice as long but with no change in quality. In writing, a long vowel is often indicated by doubling it, e.g. .
 Overlong: The vowel is held three times as long but with no change in quality. In writing, an overlong vowel is indicated by tripling it, e.g. .

Overlong vowels are rare in Luiseño, typically reserved for absolutes, such as interjections, e.g.  aaashisha, roughly "haha!" (more accurately an exclamation of praise, joy or laughter).

Variants 
However, other speakers do not use these variants.

Vowel syncope 
Vowels are often syncopated when attaching certain affixes, notably the possessive prefixes no- "my", cham- "our", etc. Hence polóv "good", but o-plovi "your goodness"; kichum "houses" (nominative case), but kichmi "houses" (accusative case).

Accent 
A stress accent most commonly falls on the first syllable of a word. 

A single consonant between a stressed and unstressed vowel is doubled. Most are geminate, such as w  and xw . However, some take a glottal stop instead: ch , kw , qw , ng , th , v , x  (Elliot 1999: 14–16.)

As a rule, the possessive prefixes are unstressed. The accent remains on the first syllable of the root word, e.g. nokaamay "my son" and never *nokaamay. One rare exception is the word  pó-ha "alone" (< po- "his/her/its" + ha "self"), whose invariable prefix and fixed accent suggests that it is now considered a single lexical item (compare noha "myself", poha "him/herself", etc.).

Consonants 
Luiseño has a fairly rich consonant inventory.

 are found only in borrowed words, principally from Spanish and English.
However, only  occurs intervocalically, and only  is found preconsonantally and at word final position. Examples of these allophones in complementary distribution abound, such as yaásh ('man ') and yaáchi ('man ').
 is trilled at the beginning of a word and a tap between vowels.
The two sibilants have also been described as dental and retroflex  (Elliot 1999: 14).

Orthography 

Along with an extensive oral tradition, Luiseño has a written tradition that stretches back to the Spanish settlement of San Diego. Pablo Tac (1822–1841), a native Luiseño speaker and Mission Indian, was the first to develop an orthography for his native language while studying in Rome to be a Catholic priest. His orthography leaned heavily on Spanish, which he learned in his youth. Although Luiseño has no standardized spelling, a commonly accepted orthography is implemented in reservation classrooms and college campuses in San Diego where the language is taught. 

The alphabet taught in schools is:
 ꞌa ch ꞌe h ꞌi k kw l m n ng ꞌo p q qw r s s̸ sh th t ꞌu v w x xw y

Current orthography marks stress with an acute accent on the stressed syllable's vowel, e.g. chilúy "speak Spanish", koyóowut "whale". Formerly, stress might be marked on both letters of a long vowel, e.g. koyóówut, or by underlining, e.g. koyoowut "whale"; stress was not marked when it fell on the first syllable, e.g. hiicha "what" (currently híicha). The marking of word-initial stress, like the marking of predictable glottal stop, is a response to language revitalization efforts. 

The various orthographies that have been used for writing the language show influences from Spanish, English and Americanist phonetic notation.

Sample texts 
The Lord's Prayer (or the Our Father) in Luiseño, as recorded in The Sparkman Grammar of Luiseño.

Cham-na tuupanga aaukat cham-cha oi ohóvanma.
Toshngo om chaami.
Lovíi om hish mimchapun ivá ooxng tuupanga axáninuk.
Ovi om chaamik cham-naachaxoni choun teméti.
Maaxaxan-up om chaamik hish aláxwichi chaam-loxai ivianáninuk chaam-cha maaxaxma pomóomi chaami hish pom-loxai aláxwichi.
Tuusho kamíii chaami chaam-loxai hish hichakati.
Kwavcho om chaami.

Our-father / sky-in / being / we / you / believe / always.
Command / you / us.
Do / you / anything / whatever / here / earth-on / sky-in / as.
Give / you / us-to / our-food / every / day.
Pardon / you / us-to / anything / bad / our-doing / this as /we / pardon / them / us / anything / their-doing / bad.
Not / allow / us / our-doing / anything / wicked.
Care / you / us.

Linguistic documentation
Linguist John Peabody Harrington made a series of recordings of speakers of Luiseño in the 1930s. Those recordings, made on aluminum disks, were deposited in the United States National Archives. They have since been digitized and made available over the internet by the Smithsonian Institution.

See also

 Luiseño
 Mission Indians

References

Sources

External links 
 Luiseño language revitalization project
 Pechanga Band of Luiseño Indians
 Soboba Band of Luiseño Indians
 Luiseño language overview at the Survey of California and Other Indian Languages
 
OLAC resources in and about the Luiseno language

Luiseño
Takic
Takic languages
Endangered Uto-Aztecan languages
Native American language revitalization